Campo Limpo may refer to:

 Subprefecture of Campo Limpo, São Paulo
 Campo Limpo (district of São Paulo)
 Campo Limpo (São Paulo Metro)
 Campo Limpo Paulista, a municipality in the state of São Paulo
 Campo Limpo de Goiás, a municipality in the state of Goiás

See also
Roman Catholic Diocese of Campo Limpo